Kanawut Traipipattanapong, born 4 December 1997 in Bangkok, Thailand, nicknamed Gulf, is a Thai actor and model. He is known for his role as Type in TharnType: The Series.

Career

Acting 
Kanawut's acting career began in 2015, when he played as "Young Tee", a guest role, in one of Channel 3's lakorn, Mafia Luerd Mungkorn: Singha. After taking a hiatus, in late January 2019, he was announced to star as "Type"— one of the main protagonists of One 31 and LINE TV's TharnType: The Series. The series immediately gained popularity within Thailand as well as internationally.

In February 2020, it was confirmed that the series would get its continuation, namely as TharnType 2: 7 Years of Love. Kanawut would still star as the protagonist,"Type", in the series. It later premiered in November 2020 via One 31 and LINE TV.

From his acting in TharnType: The Series Kanawut won "Rising Star" and "Best Young Actor" at the Kazz Awards 2020. Also he won "Moon of the Yniverse" and "Iconic Star of the Yuniverse" at the Yniverse Award 2020. Kanawut and his co-star Suppasit won "Best Kiss Scene" at the 2020 LINE TV Awards for a scene in TharnType: The Series and "Best Couple" at the Maya Awards 2020.

In 2021, Kanawut made several appearances in music videos of Thai singers, namely VYRA and Polycat. Later on, he also appeared in KINGKHOM โคตรพยัคฆ์หยุดแผนล้างโลก, a short film promoting Garena Free Fire Thailand with Kom Chuanchuen, a famous Thai comedian. Regrettably, Kom died due to COVID-19 before it was released.

Kanawut was officially announced as an actor under Channel 3 in March 2021.

Modelling 
Kanawut started his modelling career in 2015 by posing as a model for small Thai-based clothing lines. Kanawut walked his first runway for Wonder Anatomie, as the Thai brand celebrated its tenth anniversary.

Kanawut has appeared on several covers of magazines, including the February issue of Harper's Bazaar Thailand, as the first boys' love (BL) couple to do so in the history of the magazine.  An outpouring of fans trying to read the article caused Harper's Bazaar Thailand's website to crash.

Kanawut got his first solo magazine cover in 2020, appearing on cover of L'Officiel Thailand.

Filmography

Film

Television

Shows

Music video appearances

Discography

Awards and nominations

References 

Living people
Kanawut Traipipattanapong
Kanawut Traipipattanapong
1997 births